The following lists are of prominent jurists, including judges, listed in alphabetical order by jurisdiction.

Premodern
Ur-Nammu
Hammurabi
 Solomon
 Ancient India
 Manu
 Chanakya
Ancient Greece:
Draco
Lycurgus
Solon
Ancient Rome
Numa Pompilius
Gaius Terentilius Harsa
Marcus Tullius Cicero
Gaius
Herennius Modestinus
Aemilius Papinianus
Paulus
Domitius Ulpianus
Byzantine Empire
Enantiophanes
Tribonian
 Islamic
 Muhammad
 Abu Hanifa
 Malik ibn Anas
 Al-Shafi‘i
 Ahmad ibn Hanbal
 Al-Ghazali
 Ibn Taymiyyah
 Ibn Khaldun
Medieval Roman Law
Azo of Bologna
Irnerius
Accursius
Cino da Pistoia
Bartolus de Saxoferrato
Baldus de Ubaldis
Matteo D'Afflitto
Canon law
John Gascoigne
Johann Georg Reiffenstuel
Post-medieval
Antoine Dadin de Hauteserre
Gerhard Diephuis
Belchior Febos
Ramón Llàtzer de Dou de Bassols
Ivan Jakovlevich Fojnickij

Modern jurists by country

Argentina
 Luis Moreno Ocampo 
 Eugenio Raul Zaffaroni

Australia

 Sir Edmund Barton (judge)
 Sir Garfield Barwick (judge)
 Sir Gerard Brennan (judge)
 Julian Burnside (Queen's Counsel)
 Sir William Deane (judge, Governor-General)
 Sir Owen Dixon (judge)
 Dr H.V. Evatt (judge, politician)
 Robert French (judge)
 Mary Gaudron (judge)
 Sir Harry Gibbs (judge)
 Murray Gleeson (judge)
 Sir Samuel Griffith (judge)
 H.B. Higgins (judge)
 Sir Isaac Isaacs (judge, Governor-General)
 David Ipp (judge)
 Michael Kirby (judge)
 Sir Adrian Knox (judge)
 Sir Anthony Mason (judge) 
 Lionel Murphy (judge)
 Richard O'Connor (judge)
 Geoffrey Robertson (Queen's Counsel)
 Sir Ninian Stephen (judge)
 Julius Stone
 Sir Ronald Wilson (judge)

Austria
 Ludwig Adamovich Sr., former president of the Austrian Constitutional Court
 Ludwig Adamovich Jr., former president of the Austrian Constitutional Court
 Walter Antoniolli, former president of the Austrian Constitutional Court
 Eugen Ehrlich, legal sociologist
 Hans Kelsen, Constitutional theorist, draftsman of the Austrian constitution and creator of the Pure Theory of Law
 Karl Korinek, former president of the Austrian Constitutional Court
 Franz von Zeiller, draftsman of the final version of the Austrian Civil Code of 1811

Bangladesh
A. K. Fazlul Huq
Radhabinod Pal
Syed Mahbub Murshed
Justice Mustafa Kamal
Azizul Haque
Kamal Hossain
Khatun Sapnara

Brazil
Pimenta Bueno
Eusébio de Queirós
Zacarias de Góis e Vasconcelos
Cândido Mendes de Almeida
Viscount of Rio Branco
Ernesto Carneiro Ribeiro
 Rui Barbosa
 Clóvis Beviláqua
Baron of Rio Branco
Joaquim Nabuco
Heráclito Fontoura Sobral Pinto
Hermes Lima
San Tiago Dantas
Evandro Lins e Silva
Victor Nunes Leal
Alfredo Buzaid
Paulo Brossard
Raymundo Faoro
Joaquim Barbosa
Walter Moraes
Marco Aurélio Mello
 Celso Lafer
 Francisco Cavalcanti Pontes de Miranda
 Miguel Reale
 Augusto Teixeira de Freitas

Brunei
 Geoffrey Briggs

Cameroon
 Fojou Pierre Robert
Née le 19 Mai 1969, Pierre Robert Fojou est un Avocat au Barreau du Cameroun depuis 2001, quand il a prêté serment. Mariée et père de plusieurs
enfants, Maître Fojou est reconnu parmi les meilleurs Avocats du Cameroun par son expertise en matière de propriété intellectuelle et en droit des affaires. Il est d'ailleurs un mandataire agréé de l'OAPI, membre de l'union internationale des avocats, membre de l'international trademark association, membre à vie de l'union panafricaine des avocats.

En 2018, il est élu Membre du conseil de l'ordre des Avocats et est nommée représentant adjoint du Bâtonnier pour les régions du centre, sud, est. Suite au décès du Bâtonnier en 2020, il assure l'intérim du représentant du Bâtonnier pour les mêmes régions jusqu'au élections de 2022, ou il fini premier conseiller national avec plus de 1,600 voix. Il est alors nommé à ce même poste de représentant adjoint C-S-E par le Bâtonnier Eric Mbah.  
C'est par son dévouement au sein de sa profession et ses réussites qu'il a été nommé le 20 ,ai 2020 Chevalier de l'ordre de la Valeur par son excellence Monsieur le Président de la République, Paul Biya.

Me Fojou est aussi reconnu comme le sauveur des élèves ayant été accusés dans la fraude des examens officiels en 2020, dont il a été l'avocat en compagnie Me Sim avec qu'ils ont réussi à obtenir la libération.

Canada
 Rosalie Abella
 Louise Arbour
 Matthew Baillie Begbie
 Denise Bellamy
 William Hume Blake
 Louise Charron
 Henry Pering Pellew Crease
 Brian Dickson
 John Gomery
 Peter Hogg
 Louis-Hippolyte Lafontaine
 Antonio Lamer
 Bora Laskin
 John McClung
 Beverley McLachlin, first female Chief Justice of Canada (2000-2017)
 Roy McMurtry
 Louis-Philippe Pigeon
 F. R. Scott, also a poet (Francis Reginald Scott, or Frank Scott)
 Robert Taschereau
 Stephen Waddams

Colombia
Carlos Medellín Forero
Carlos Lemos Simmonds

Cyprus
Solon Nikitas
Alecos Markides
Phytos Poetis

Czechoslovakia
Emil Hácha
František Ladislav Rieger

Czech Republic
Petra Buzková
Otakar Motejl
Petr Pithart
Cyril Svoboda

Denmark
Alf Ross
Anders Sandøe Ørsted

England & Wales

John Selden
Sir Francis Bacon
 Sir Redmond Barry, QC
 Sir William Blackstone
 Lord Browne-Wilkinson
 Sir Edward Coke
 Lord Denning
 Albert Venn Dicey 
 Sir Matthew Hale
 Lord Hutton
 Lord Goff of Chieveley
 Thomas More
 Lord Morris of Borth-y-Gest
 Lord Scarman
 Hartley Shawcross
 Lord Templeman
 Lord Woolf
 Lord Mansfield
 Sir Ronald Waterhouse, QC

France
 Charles Aubry
 Jean-Louis Bruguière, investigative magistrate specialized on terrorism cases
 Jean Jacques Régis de Cambacérès, main author of the Napoleonic Code
 Guy Canivet, first president of the Court of Cassation
 Renaud Denoix de Saint Marc, vice-president of the Conseil d'État
 Jean-Jacques Gaspard Foelix (1791–1853) founder of the science of comparative law in France.
 Georges Gurvitch
 Claude Jorda
 Edouard de Laboulaye
 Pierre Mazeaud, president of the Constitutional Council of France
 Jean-Étienne-Marie Portalis
 Jean-Paul Beraudo
 Joseph Dallois

Germany
 Claus-Wilhelm Canaris, leading drafter of the modern Bürgerliches Gesetzbuch
 Philipp Heck, representative of sociological jurisprudence (Interessenjurisprudenz)
 Roman Herzog, President of the German Constitutional Court and later President of Germany
 :es: Günther Jakobs
 Rudolf von Jhering, founder of sociological jurisprudence (Interessenjurisprudenz)
 Hermann Kantorowicz, proponent of the Free Law School (Freirechtslehre)
 Burkard Wilhelm Leist (1819–1906)
 Richard Rosendorff (fl. 1875–1941)
 Claus Roxin, founder of the "Tatherrschaftslehre"
 Friedrich Carl von Savigny, 19th century legal scholar of the historical school
 Carl Schmitt, legal theorist
 Bernhard Windscheid, leading drafter of the BGB
 Reinhold Zippelius, German representative of critical rationalism in jurisprudence
 Robert Alexy

Hong Kong
 Kemal Bokhary (judge)
 Charles Ching (judge)
 Andrew Li (judge) 
 Henry Litton (judge)
 Charles Ching
 Denys Roberts
 Robert Ribeiro
 George Phillippo
 Yang Ti-liang
 Patrick Yu

India
 B. R. Ambedkar
 Subodh Markandeya
 K. K. Mathew
 Flavia Agnes
 Upendra Baxi
 P. B. Gajendragadkar
 Justice V.R Krishna Iyer
 Ram Jethmalani
 Fali S. Nariman
 N. R. Madhava Menon
 Nanabhoy Palkhivala
Justice P. N. Bhagwati
 B.S. Chimni
 M.P. Singh
 K N Chandrasekharan Pillai
 Justice Dhananjaya Y. Chandrachud
 Justice Y. V. Chandrachud
 Radhabinod Pal
 Hari Singh Gour
 B. N. Srikrishna
 Shamnad Basheer
 M. C. Setalvad
 Mandagadde Rama Jois
Dr. Faizan Mustafa
Adish C. Aggarwala

Iran
 Shirin Ebadi

Ireland
William Binchy (Regius Professor of Laws in Trinity College, Dublin)
Declan Costello (former President of the High Court and Attorney-General)
Susan Denham (Judge of the Supreme Court)
Thomas Finlay (former Chief Justice)
Dermot Gleeson (Senior Counsel and former Attorney-General)
Adrian Hardiman (Judge of the Supreme Court)
Gerard Hogan (Senior Counsel, Lecturer in Trinity College, Dublin, co-editor of the later editions of "J.M. Kelly: The Irish Constitution")
Ronan Keane (former Chief Justice)
John M. Kelly (late Attorney-General and author of the commentary "The Irish Constitution")
Hugh Kennedy (late Chief Justice and Attorney-General)
John L. Murray (Chief Justice and former Attorney-General)
Cearbhall Ó Dálaigh (late Chief Justice, Attorney-General and President of Ireland)
Thomas O'Higgins (late Chief Justice)
Mary Robinson (former Barrister, Professor and later President of Ireland)

Israel

Miriam Ben-Porat
Itzhak Nener
Gabriela Shalev

Italy

 Thomas Aquinas
 Alberico Gentili
 Niccolò Machiavelli
 Giambattista Vico
 Cesare Beccaria
 Francesco Mario Pagano
 Benedetto Marcello
 Francesco Carrara
 Gaetano Filangieri
 Piero Calamandrei
 Francesco Carnelutti
 Pietro della Vigna
 Vincenzo Caianiello
 Francesco Parisi
 Luigi Ferrari Bravo
 Dionisio Anzilotti
 Bettina d'Andrea
 Riccardo Petroni
 Gino Giugni
 Giovanni Conso
 Enrico De Nicola
 Leopoldo Elia
 Marco Biagi
 Giovanni Maria Flick
 Giuliano Vassalli
 Gustavo Zagrebelsky

Lebanon

Macau

 Sam Hou Fai – Presidente
 Lai Kin Hong – Presidente
 Tam Hio Wa – Presidente dos Tribunais de Primeira Instancia
 Alice Leonor das Neves Costa – Presidente de tribunal colectivo
 Lau Cheok Va – Presidente

Morocco 

 Amina, bint al-Hajj ʿAbd al-Latif (fl.1802-12), scribe and scholar

Nepal
 Rajendra Kumar Acharya

The Netherlands 
 Hugo Grotius
 Tobias Asser, played major role in the formation of the Permanent Court of Arbitration, joint recipient of the 1911 Nobel Prize for Peace
 Johannes Bob van Benthem, first president of the European Patent Office
 Rudolph Cleveringa, professor at Leyden University who publicly protested against the removal of Jewish colleagues from the university by the German occupier
 Pieter Hendrik Kooijmans, judge on the International Court of Justice
 Henry G. Schermers, professor at Leiden University, founder of Mordenate College and member of the European Commission for Human Rights
 Bert Röling, judge on the International Military Tribunal for the Far East in Tokyo

Pakistan

 Muhammad Iqbal
 Abul A'la Maududi
 Rashid Rehman 
 Ali Ahmad Kurd
 Abdul Hafiz Pirzada
 Agha Rafiq Ahmed Khan
 Shahid Hamid 
 Mudassar Rasheed
 S.M. Zafar
 Mian Tufail Mohammad
 Ashtar Ausaf Ali 
 Liaquat Ali Khan
 Ghulam Farooq Awan 
 Hina Jilani
 Asma Jahangir
 Khurshid Mahmud Kasuri 
 Sadiq Khan
 Wasim Sajjad

Philippines
 Ricardo C. Puno

Portugal 

Medieval Period:
João Das Regras
Modern Period:
Sebastião José de Carvalho e Melo
Liberalism/Constitucional Monarchy:
Mouzinho da Silveira
António Luís de Seabra
António Bernardo de Costa Cabral
João Franco
Manuel da Silva Passos
José António de Miranda Pereira de Meneses
Contemporary Period:
José Manuel Hespanha
José Manuel Durão Barroso
Jorge Miranda
José Hermano Saraiva
Fernando Machado Soares
António Menezes Cordeiro
Miguel Sousa Tavares
Marcelo Rebelo de Sousa
Manuel Lobo Antunes

Scotland

 Colin Boyd, Lord Advocate
 Lord Cullen of Whitekirk, Lord President of the Court of Session of Scotland
 Lord Brian Gill, Lord Justice Clerk of Scotland
 Sir Neil MacCormick
 Lord Rodger of Earlsferry
 Lord Donald MacArthur Ross

Serbia
 Slobodan Jovanović
 Milovan Milovanović
 Jovan Sterija Popović
 Smilja Avramov
 Mirko Vasiljević
 Miodrag Majić

Soviet Union & Russian Federation
Andrey Vyshinsky
Evgeny Pashukanis 
 Major-General Iola Nikitchenko
Pavel Yudin

Spain
 Gloria Begué Cantón
 Fèlix Maria Falguera
 Eduardo Garcia de Enterria y Martinez-Carande
 Baltasar Garzón
 Juan Sempere y Guarinos

Sri Lanka
Christopher Weeramantry
 Mark Fernando
 Neelan Tiruchelvam
 Deepika Udagama

Switzerland
 Eugen Huber, University of Berne, drafter of the Zivilgesetzbuch, the Swiss Civil Code.
 Walter Kälin

United States

 Robert Araujo, S.J. International Law Professor at Loyola University Chicago School of Law
 Randy Barnett (born 1952), Law Professor at Georgetown University Law Center 
 Paul Butler (professor) (born 1961) is an American lawyer, former prosecutor, and current Law Professor Georgetown University Law Center
 William Brennan (1906–1997), Associate Justice, Supreme Court of the United States
 Louis Brandeis (1856–1941), Associate Justice, Supreme Court of the United States
 Warren E. Burger (1907–1995), Chief Justice of the United States
 Mike Cicconetti (born 1951), judge, Lake County, Ohio
 Benjamin N. Cardozo (1870–1938), Associate Justice, Supreme Court of the United States
 Felix Frankfurter (1882–1965), Associate Justice, Supreme Court of the United States
 Henry Friendly (1903–1986), judge, United States Court of Appeals for the Second Circuit
 Ruth Bader Ginsburg (1933–2020), Associate Justice, Supreme Court of the United States
 Learned Hand (1872–1961), judge, United States Court of Appeals for the Second Circuit
 Oliver Wendell Holmes Jr. (1841–1935), Associate Justice, Supreme Court of the United States
 John Marshall Harlan (1833–1911), Associate Justice, Supreme Court of the United States
 Lance Ito (born 1950), judge, Superior Court of California, Los Angeles County
 John Jay (1745–1829), Chief Justice of the United States
 Alex Kozinski (born 1950), judge, United States Court of Appeals for the Ninth Circuit
 Mills Lane (born 1936), judge, Marine, Boxing Referee
 Hans A. Linde (1924–2020), justice, Oregon Supreme Court
 John Marshall (1755–1835), Chief Justice of the United States
 Thurgood Marshall (1908–1993), Associate Justice, Supreme Court of the United States
 Frank Murphy (1890–1949), Associate Justice, Supreme Court of the United States; Judge Recorder's Court.
Martha Nussbaum (present) Ernst Freund Distinguished Service Professor of Law and Ethics at the University of Chicago
 Richard Posner (born 1939), judge, United States Court of Appeals for the Seventh Circuit
 Lysander Spooner (1808–1887), Abolitionist, Jurist, Lawyer, Entrepreneur
 Joseph Story (1779–1845), Associate Justice, Supreme Court of the United States
 Roger J. Traynor (1900–1983), Chief Justice, Supreme Court of California
 Earl Warren (1891–1974), Chief Justice of the United States
 John Minor Wisdom (1905–1999), judge, United States Court of Appeals for the Fifth Circuit
 William Rehnquist (1924–2005), Chief Justice of the United States
 Antonin Scalia (1936–2016), Associate Justice, Supreme Court of the United States

Canon law
 Eugenio Corecco—(1931–1995), notable for his contributions to the philosophy, theology, and fundamental theory of Catholic canon law
 John D. Faris—(born 1951), prominent scholar of Eastern Catholic canon law
 Pietro Gasparri—(1852–1934), architect of the 1917 Code of Canon Law
 Edward N. Peters—(born 1957), Referendary of the Apostolic Signatura (legal consultant to the highest canonical court), prominent scholar of canon law

International Courts at the Hague

 Bruno Simma
 Claude Jorda
 Rosalyn Higgins
 Luis Moreno Ocampo
 Carla Del Ponte

Jurists